The 2013 Taça de Angola was the 32nd edition of the Taça de Angola, the second most important and the top knock-out football club competition in Angola, following the Girabola. Petro de Luanda beat Desportivo da Huíla 1–0 in the final to secure its tenth title.

The winner and the runner-up qualified to the CAF Confederation Cup.

Stadia and locations

Championship bracket

Preliminary rounds

Round of 16

Quarter-finals

Semi-finals

Final

See also
 2013 Girabola
 2014 Angola Super Cup
 2014 CAF Confederation Cup
 Petro de Luanda players
 Desportivo da Huíla players

External links
 Tournament profile at girabola.com
 Tournament profile at rsssf.com

References

Angola Cup
Taca de Angola
Taca de Angola